Téméraire was the lead ship of the  74-gun ship of the line of the French Navy.

Career 
In 1782 or 1783, she was under Sainte-Eulalie.

She took part in the Bataille du 13 prairial an 2, battling , under Captain Morel. 

She took part in the Croisière du Grand Hiver of winter 1794-1795, but sustained damage when a leak opened in her hull in the night of the 30 to 31 December, and she had to return to Saint Malo.

Fate 
From 1798, Téméraire was in a state of disrepair and needed to be refitted or demolished. She was eventually condemned in 1802 and broken up in 1803.

Sources and references 
 Notes

Citations

Bibliography
 

External links
 Ships of the line

Ships of the line of the French Navy
Téméraire-class ships of the line
1782 ships